SC3 may refer to:

 South Carolina's 3rd congressional district
 South Carolina Highway 3, a state highway in South Carolina
 Santa Clause 3: The Escape Clause, a 2006 American film that is third in the Santa Clause movie series
 SC3, a spin-off pop-group, made of 3 original members of S Club 7
 Secret Chiefs 3, an avant-garde/experimental instrumental rock music group
 , a United States Navy submarine chaser commissioned in 1918 and sold in 1920
 SC3, a candidate phylum of bacteria from arid soil
 SC03, a FIPS 10-4 region code, see List of FIPS region codes (S–U)
 SC-03, a subdivision code for the Seychelles, see ISO 3166-2:SC

Video games
 Soul Calibur III, a PlayStation 2 fighting game produced by Namco
 Star Control 3, a video game developed by Legend Entertainment
 SimCity 3000, a city-building simulation personal computer game and the third major installment in the SimCity series
 Tom Clancy's Splinter Cell: Chaos Theory, a third-person stealth-based video game also known as Splinter Cell 3